SM UC-8 was a German Type UC I minelayer submarine or U-boat in the German Imperial Navy during World War I. The U-boat had been ordered by November 1914 and was launched on 6 July 1915. She was commissioned into the German Imperial Navy on 5 July 1915 as SM UC-8. Mines laid by UC-8 in her one patrol are not known to have sunk any ships. UC-8 ran aground on the Dutch coast near Terschelling on 4 November 1915. Interned by the Dutch, UC-8 was purchased and commissioned into the Dutch Navy as HNLMS M-1. The submarine was broken up in 1932.

Design
A German Type UC I submarine, UC-8 had a displacement of  when at the surface and  while submerged. The submarine was powered by one Daimler-Motoren-Gesellschaft six-cylinder, four-stroke diesel engine producing , an electric motor producing , and one propeller shaft.

UC-8 was fitted with six  mine tubes, twelve UC 120 mines, and one  machine gun. She was built by AG Vulcan Stettin and her complement was fourteen crew members.

Notes

References

Bibliography

 
 

German Type UC I submarines
Ships built in Hamburg
1915 ships
U-boats commissioned in 1915
World War I submarines of Germany
World War I minelayers of Germany
Maritime incidents in 1915
Submarines of the Royal Netherlands Navy